The 2019 Illinois State Redbirds football team represented Illinois State University as a member of the Missouri Valley Football Conference (MVFC) during the 2019 NCAA Division I FCS football season. Led by 11th-year head coach Brock Spack, the Redbirds compiled an overall record of 10–5 with a mark of 5–3 in conference play, placing in a three-way tie for third in the MVFC. Illinois State received an at-large bid to the NCAA Division I Football Championship playoffs, where the Redbirds beat Southeast Missouri State in the first round and Central Arkansas in the second round before losing to the eventual national champion, North Dakota State, in the quarterfinals. The team played home games at Hancock Stadium in Normal, Illinois.

Preseason

MVFC poll
In the MVFC preseason poll released on July 29, 2019, the Redbirds were predicted to finish in third place.

Preseason All–MVFC team
The Redbirds had four players selected to the preseason all-MVFC team.

Offense

James Robinson – RB

Drew Himmelman – OL

Defense

Luther Kirk – DB

Devin Taylor – DB

Schedule

Game summaries

at Northern Illinois

Morehead State

at Eastern Illinois

Northern Arizona

North Dakota State

at Southern Illinois

at Western Illinois

Indiana State

Northern Iowa

at South Dakota State

Missouri State

at Youngstown State

at Southeast Missouri State—NCAA Division I First Round
The Redbirds were selected for the postseason tournament, with a first-round pairing against Southeast Missouri State.

at Central Arkansas—NCAA Division I Second Round

at North Dakota State—NCAA Division I Quarterfinal

Ranking movements

References

Illinois State
Illinois State Redbirds football seasons
Illinois State
Illinois State Redbirds football